David A. Martin (1937 – August 2, 1987) was a founding member and original bass player for the rock group Sam the Sham, and recorded all their early hits on MGM Records. Martin also co-wrote the group's No. 1 hit "Wooly Bully" which sold over three million records. After leaving the group in late 1965, he returned to Garland, Texas, a Dallas suburb, where he operated a television and video repair shop, located on Lavon Drive (Highway 78), until his death.

A native of Dallas, Texas, Martin started his musical career in 1959 with a band called Tommy & the Tom Toms, which became The Bill Smith Combo in 1960, and recorded several singles for Chess Records. He also worked with Gene Summers, Freddy Fender and Scotty McKay.

Martin died in August 1987 from a heart attack, at the age of 50.

References

1937 births
1987 deaths
People from Garland, Texas
American pop musicians
Songwriters from Texas
American rock musicians
20th-century American bass guitarists
Guitarists from Texas
American male bass guitarists
20th-century American male musicians
Musicians from Dallas
American male songwriters